Ponerorchis puberula is a species of orchid.

Range
The orchid is native to the Eastern Himalaya.

References

Flora of East Himalaya
puberula
 Flora of Bhutan
 Orchids of Bhutan